BKR may refer to:

Baker, U.S. Navy rank 
the National Rail station code for Blackridge railway station, West Lothian, Scotland
the postal code for Birkirkara, Malta
Brad Keselowski Racing, a former stock car team